= Dove (espionage program) =

Chinese espionage program

Dove is an espionage program by the Chinese government that relies on unmanned drones designed to resemble birds.
